Messalonskee may refer to:
 Messalonskee High School
 Messalonskee Lake